Ali Sunan (born 1 November 1970) is an Indonesian football player and manager who has previously played as amidfielder for PKT Bontang, PSIS Semarang, Persela Lamongan, PSJS South Jakarta and the Indonesia national team.

International career
He received his first international cap on 31 July 1999 against Cambodia and retired from the Indonesia national football team on 20 November 1999 against Cambodia, appearing in 10 matches and scoring 2 goals. Ali scored the first goal for Indonesia in the Football at the 1999 Southeast Asian Games tournament against Malaysia.

International goals
|}

Hounors

Clubs
PSIS Semarang :
Liga Indonesia Premier Division champions : 1 (1998-99)

Individuals
Liga Indonesia Premier Division best-players : 1 (1998–99)

References

1970 births
Association football midfielders
Living people
Indonesian footballers
Indonesia international footballers
PKT Bontang players
PSIS Semarang players
Persela Lamongan players
PSJS South Jakarta players
Indonesian Premier Division players
Place of birth missing (living people)
Southeast Asian Games bronze medalists for Indonesia
Southeast Asian Games medalists in football
Competitors at the 1999 Southeast Asian Games
People from Lamongan Regency
Sportspeople from East Java